The 2014 BWF Grand Prix Gold and Grand Prix was the eighth season of the BWF Grand Prix Gold and Grand Prix.

Schedule
Below is the schedule released by Badminton World Federation:

Results

Winners

Performance by countries
Tabulated below are the Grand Prix performances based on countries. Only countries who have won a title are listed:

Grand Prix Gold

India Grand Prix Gold

German Open

Swiss Open

Malaysia Grand Prix Gold

China Masters

U.S. Open

Chinese Taipei Open

Indonesian Masters

Bitburger Open

Macau Open

Grand Prix

New Zealand Open

Canada Open

Russia Open

Brazil Open

Vietnam Open

Dutch Open

Korea Grand Prix

Scottish Open

U.S. Open

References

Grand Prix Gold and Grand Prix
BWF Grand Prix Gold and Grand Prix